The 1924 German football championship, the 17th edition of the competition, was won by 1. FC Nürnberg, defeating Hamburger SV 2–0 in the final.

For 1. FC Nürnberg it was the third national championship. It was part of Nuremberg's most successful era where the club won five titles in eight seasons from 1920 to 1927, missing out on a sixth one in the inconclusive 1922 championship. For Hamburger SV, the defending champions, it was the third final appearance in three season, having faced Nuremberg once before in the 1922 final. Hamburg's next final appearance would come in 1928 when it defeated Hertha BSC.

SpVgg Leipzig's Erich Roßburg and 1. FC Nürnberg's Luitpold Popp were the top scorers of the 1924 championship with three goals each.

Seven club qualified for the knock-out competition, the champions of each of the seven regional football championships. It was the last edition with seven clubs as, from 1925 onwards, sixteen clubs would play in the competition.

Qualified teams
The teams qualified through the regional championships:

Competition

Quarter-finals
The quarter-finals, played on 11 May 1924:

|}
 Duisburger SpV received a bye for the quarter-finals

Semi-finals
The semi-finals, played on 29 May 1924:

|}

Final

References

Sources
 kicker Allmanach 1990, by kicker, page 160 to 178 – German championship
 Süddeutschlands Fussballgeschichte in Tabellenform 1897-1988  History of Southern German football in tables, publisher & author: Ludolf Hyll

External links
 German Championship 1923–24 at weltfussball.de 
 German Championship 1924 at RSSSF

1
German
German football championship seasons